Music from the Motion Picture Hardball is the soundtrack to Brian Robbins' 2001 film Hardball. It was released on September 11, 2001 through Columbia Records and consisted of hip hop and R&B music. The album reached number 55 on the Billboard 200, number 34 on the Top R&B/Hip-Hop Albums chart, and number 4 on the Top Soundtracks chart. The title track was released as a single and peaked at No. 77 on the Billboard Hot R&B/Hip-Hop Singles & Tracks chart.

Track listing

Charts

References

External links

2001 soundtrack albums
Sports film soundtracks
Hip hop soundtracks
Rhythm and blues soundtracks
Columbia Records soundtracks
Albums produced by R. Kelly
Albums produced by Rick Rock
Albums produced by Sean Combs
Albums produced by Mannie Fresh
Albums produced by Jermaine Dupri
Albums produced by Havoc (musician)
Albums produced by Bryan-Michael Cox
Albums produced by Bink (record producer)
Comedy-drama film soundtracks